Marc López and Rafael Nadal were the defending champions, but lost in the first round to Mariusz Fyrstenberg and Marcin Matkowski.

Guillermo García-López and Albert Montañés defeated František Čermák and Michal Mertiňák in the final, 6–4, 7–5.

Seeds

Draw

Draw

External links
Main Draw

Doubles